Abhijat Joshi (born 1 December 1969) is an Indian screenwriter, film director, producer and editor who works in Hindi cinema. His is known for collaboration with Vinod Chopra Productions and director Rajkumar Hirani, as the screenwriter for Lage Raho Munna Bhai  (2006), 3 Idiots (2009), PK (2014) and Sanju (2018). He is a professor of English at Otterbein University in Westerville, Ohio, since 2003.

Early life and education
Joshi was born and brought up in Ahmedabad, Gujarat to family of professors, including his father Jayant Joshi. Abhijat received his early education in Gujarati medium. He obtained his higher education and qualifications from shri H.K.Arts College,(With Bagal thela group) Gujarat University. After doing his M.A. (English) with distinction.

He received his Master of Fine Arts from the Michener Center for Writers at the University of Texas at Austin. Apart from English, he can fluently read, write and speak Gujarati language as he was born and brought up amidst Gujarati-speaking people.

Career
He studied in one of the very reputable Gujarati schools named Shree Vidyanagar High School in Ahmedabad, where he took part in the annual competitions for Gujarati dramas in the school . He won multiple awards . He enjoyed playing cricket. He joined C.U. Shah Arts College situated in western part of Ahmedabad city, as a professor of English for a while before moving to the US for his MFA degree. Writing stories and plays was his passion from his childhood. He penned number of plays, skits in Gujarati and English languages.

Apart from teaching, he was also involved in theatre activities. His younger brother Saumya Joshi was also professor and is now theatre personality. His father and mother also were professors. During 1992 Gujarat riots, he wrote a theatre production, "A Shaft of Sunlight", which was critically acclaimed; subsequently director Vidhu Vinod Chopra saw the play, which led to them working together in the films, Kareeb and Mission Kashmir. A UK based Tamasha Theatre Company in collaboration with Greenwich Repertory Company performed more than 300 Shows, later the play was also adapted in Gujarati as "Marmbhed"

Like his father Jayant Joshi, who is a Sane Guruji (noted Marathi social reformer Pandurang Sadashiv Sane) scholar, Abhijat was deeply influenced by Sane Guruji. His father drew his attention to the profound concept of dharma as Sane Guruji saw it. All these readings have helped him immensely in writing stories.

In 2015, he scripted Vidhu Vinod Chopra's Hollywood flick Broken Horses. As of 2016, he is working on two scripts, the third film of the Munnabhai series, and actor Sanjay Dutt's biopic.

Personal life
He lives in central Ohio, where he teaches at Otterbein University in Westerville, Ohio. He is married, and has one daughter. His younger brother, Saumya Joshi, is a playwright and screenwriter best known for the 2012 film OMG - Oh My God! and 102 Not Out, both of which were directed by Umesh Shukla.

In 2016, Joshi underwent brain surgery at the Mumbai's Hinduja Hospital, performed by neurosurgeon B. K. Misra.

Works
 A Shaft of Sunlight. Nick Hern Books. 2000. . (Hindi: Marmbhed)

Filmography 
and guest appearance also

Awards

References

External links
 
 How Gandhigiri found a place in Munnabhai (September 2006 interview)
 On Bollywood: An Interview With Abhijat Joshi (July 2004)

Indian male screenwriters
Otterbein University faculty
1969 births
Living people
Writers from Ahmedabad
Michener Center for Writers alumni
Indian male dramatists and playwrights
Filmfare Awards winners
20th-century Indian dramatists and playwrights
Screenwriters from Gujarat
20th-century Indian male writers
Best Original Screenplay National Film Award winners